Beme Seed was a New York based psychedelic noise rock band led by Kathleen Lynch, known for her collaboration with the Butthole Surfers. The band utilized guitar feedback and chanting to invoke a droning atmosphere in their music described as "panic inducing", and "supernatural". Trouser Press said of the band: "Lacking the minimal organization of even the Sun City Girls, Beme Seed captures unique psychic qualities on its three opaque and unsettling records." The demise of Beme Seed in 1992 can be seen as marking the transition from the "underground music" of the 1980s to the "alternative rock" of the early 1990s.

Discography
Beme Seed (1989, released on vinyl under the alternate title The Future Is Attacking)
Lights Unfold (1990)
Purify (1992)

References

External links
Official MySpace page
Official Facebook page

Blast First artists
Indie rock musical groups from New York (state)
Psychedelic rock music groups from New York (state)
Rough Trade Records artists